The Il-Kullana to tal-Ġifen Cliffs Important Bird Area comprises a 47 ha linear strip of cliffed coastline on the southern coast of Malta, in the Mediterranean Sea. The cliffs lie within the limits of Rabat, Dingli and Siġġiewi, and include the Dingli Cliffs. The steep and rugged cliffs rise from sea level to a height of over 100 m. It was identified as an Important Bird Area (IBA) by BirdLife International because it supports 500–1000 breeding pairs of Cory's shearwaters and 100–200 pairs of yelkouan shearwaters.

See also
 List of birds of Malta

References

Seabird colonies
Important Bird Areas of Malta
Rabat, Malta
Dingli
Siġġiewi
Cliffs of Malta